Bolt is an unincorporated community in the town of Franklin, Kewaunee County, Wisconsin, United States.

References

Unincorporated communities in Kewaunee County, Wisconsin
Unincorporated communities in Wisconsin